was an important artistic figure in early twentieth-century Japan. Born in Kyoto to a Samurai family, his talents for art and design were recognized early. He eventually allied himself with the traditional Rinpa school of art. He is considered the last great proponent of this artistic tradition. Sekka also worked in lacquer and in a variety of other media.

As traditional Japanese styles became unfashionable (such as Rimpa style), Japan implemented policies to promote the country's unique artistic style by upgrading the status of traditional artists who infused their craft with a dose of modernism. In 1901, Sekka was sent by the Japanese government to Glasgow where he was heavily influenced by Art Nouveau. He sought to learn more about the Western attraction to Japonism, and which elements or facets of Japanese art would be more attractive to the West. Returning to Japan, he taught at the newly opened Kyoto Municipal School of Arts and Crafts, experimented with Western tastes, styles, and methods, and incorporated them into his otherwise traditional Japanese-style works. While he sticks to traditional Japanese subject matter, and some elements of Rimpa painting, the overall effect is very Western and modern. He uses bright colors in large swaths, his images seeming on the verge of being patterns rather than proper pictures of a subject; the colors and patterns seem almost to "pop", giving the paintings an almost three-dimensional quality.

Momoyogusa

Momoyogusa (A World of Things) is considered Sekka's woodblock-print masterpiece. The three-volume set was commissioned between 1909 and 1910 by the publishing firm Unsōdō of Kyoto. The Japanese name of the series can first be found in the eighth-century poetic text Collection of Ten Thousand Leaves (Man'yōshū), which refers to a multi-leaved autumnal herb (momoyogusa), possibly a chrysanthemum or wormwood. The sixty image work displays a variety of landscapes, figures, classical themes, and innovative subjects, captured in a small space. They show Sekka's complete mastery of traditional Rimpa style, as well as combining his own approach and understanding of the innovations influencing Japan at the time.

See also
The pamphlet of the exhibition of Kamisaka(2007.9.22)(pdf)

References

External links

'Birds, flowers and figures on scattered fans'  Collection of the Art Gallery of New South Wales.

1866 births
1942 deaths
19th-century Japanese artists
19th-century painters
20th-century painters
19th-century Japanese painters
20th-century Japanese painters
People from Kyoto
19th-century Japanese people
20th-century Japanese people
People of Meiji-period Japan
Rinpa school
Art Nouveau painters